Anthony Minghella,  (6 January 195418 March 2008) was a British film director, playwright and screenwriter. He was chairman of the board of Governors at the British Film Institute between 2003 and 2007.

He won the Academy Award for Best Director for The English Patient (1996). In addition, he received three more Academy Award nominations; he was nominated for Best Adapted Screenplay for both The English Patient and The Talented Mr. Ripley (1999), and was posthumously nominated for Best Picture for The Reader (2008), as a producer.

Early life
Minghella was born in Ryde, on the Isle of Wight, an island off the south coast of England that is a popular holiday resort. His family are well known on the Island, where they ran a café in Ryde until the 1980s and have run an eponymous business making and selling Italian-style ice cream since the 1950s. His parents were Edoardo Minghella (an Italian immigrant) and Leeds-born Gloria Alberta (née Arcari). His mother's ancestors originally came from Valvori, a small village in southern Lazio, Italy. He was one of five children, his sisters Gioia Minghella-Giddens, Edana Minghella and Loretta Minghella, and a brother Dominic Minghella who would also become a screenwriter and producer.

Minghella attended St. Mary's Catholic Primary School, Ryde, Sandown Grammar School, and St John's College, Portsmouth. Early interests suggested a possible career as a musician, with Minghella playing keyboards with local bands Earthlight and Dancer. The latter recorded an album titled Tales of the Riverbank in 1972, although it was not released until 2001.

He attended the University of Hull, studying drama. As an undergraduate he had arrived at university with an EMI contract for the band, in which he sang and played keyboards; while at university he wrote words and music for an adaptation of Gabriel Josipovici's Mobius the Stripper (1975) .

Minghella graduated after three years and stayed on to pursue a PhD. He also taught at the university for several years, on Samuel Beckett and on the medieval theatre. Ultimately, he abandoned his pursuit of a PhD to work for the BBC.

Career
Minghella's debut work was a stage adaptation of Gabriel Josipovici's Mobius the Stripper (1975) and it was his Whale Music (1985) that brought him notice. His double bill of Samuel Beckett's Play and Happy Days was his directorial debut and debut feature film as a director was A Little Like Drowning (1978). During the 1980s, he worked in television, starting as a runner on Magpie before moving into script editing the children's drama series Grange Hill for the BBC and later writing The Storyteller series for Jim Henson. He wrote several episodes of the ITV detective drama Inspector Morse and an episode of long-running ITV drama Boon. Made in Bangkok (1986) found mainstream success in the West End.

Radio success followed with a Giles Cooper Award for the radio drama Cigarettes and Chocolate first broadcast on BBC Radio 4 in 1988. It was revived on 3 May 2008 as a tribute to its author director following his death. His production starred Juliet Stevenson, Bill Nighy and Jenny Howe. His first radio play Hang Up, starring Anton Lesser and Juliet Stevenson, was revived on 10 May 2008 as part of the BBC Radio 4 Minghella season.

Truly, Madly, Deeply (1990), a feature drama written and directed for the BBC's Screen Two anthology strand, bypassed TV broadcast and instead had a cinema release. He turned down an offer to direct another Inspector Morse to do the project, even though he believed that the Morse episode would have been a much higher-profile ll assignment. The English Patient (1996) brought him two Academy Awards nominations, Best Director (which he won) and Adapted Screenplay. He also received an Adapted Screenplay nomination for The Talented Mr. Ripley (1999).

The No. 1 Ladies' Detective Agency, a pilot episode television adaptation which he co-wrote and directed, was broadcast posthumously on BBC One (23 March 2008); watched by 6.3 million viewers. He vocally supported I Know I'm Not Alone, a film of musician Michael Franti's peacemaking excursions into Iraq, Palestine and Israel. He directed a party election broadcast for the Labour Party in 2005. The short film depicted Tony Blair and Gordon Brown working together and was criticised for being insincere: "The Anthony Minghella party political broadcast last year was full of body language fibs", said Peter Collett, a psychologist at the University of Oxford. "When you are talking to me, I'll give you my full attention only if I think you are very high status or if I love you. On that party political broadcast, they are staring at each other like lovers. It is completely false."

With Samuel Beckett's 100th birthday celebrations, he returned to radio on BBC Radio 3 with Eyes Down Looking (2006), with: Jude Law, Juliet Stevenson and David Threlfall. An operatic directorial debut came with Puccini's Madama Butterfly. Premiered at the English National Opera (London, 2005), then at the Lithuanian National Opera and Ballet Theatre (Vilnius, March 2006) and at the Metropolitan Opera (New York City, September 2006). The latter was transmitted live into cinemas worldwide (7 March 2009) as part of the Met's HD series and is now available on DVD. The ENO work was to have led to other operatic projects, directing again at English National Opera and collaborating with Osvaldo Golijov on a new opera for the Met and ENO, writing the libretto and directing the production.

He was honoured with the naming of The Anthony Minghella Theatre at the Quay Arts Centre (Isle of Wight). He made an appearance in the 2007 film Atonement as a television host interviewing the novelist central to the story.

His last work was the screenplay of the film adaptation of the Tony Award-winning musical Nine (1982); Arthur Kopit (book) and Maury Yeston (score). It is based on the film 8½. He shared credit with Michael Tolkin on the screenplay.

The department of Film, Theatre & Television at the University of Reading, opened in 2012, was named in his honour.

Personal life and death
Minghella met his first wife, Yvonne Miller, when they were students. They had one daughter, Hannah, who is currently the Head of Motion Pictures at J. J. Abrams' Bad Robot.  Minghella and Miller eventually divorced and in 1985 Minghella married Hong Kong–born choreographer and dancer Carolyn Jane Choa.  They had one son, Max, an actor, screenwriter and director. Max is best known for his role as Nick Blaine in the Hulu drama series The Handmaid's Tale.

Minghella's younger brother, Dominic Minghella, is the creator of the popular British television series Robin Hood and Doc Martin, and a scriptwriter. His sister, Loretta Minghella, is First Church Estates Commissioner at the Church Commissioners, having previously been Director of Christian Aid. His sister Edana participated in a jazz event on the Isle of Wight, and his nephew Dante is one of the participants in Channel 4's Child Genius series.

Minghella was a fan of Portsmouth F.C., and appeared in the Channel 4 documentary, Hallowed Be Thy Game. His home had two double bedrooms dedicated to the display of Portsmouth memorabilia dating back to the club's founding in 1898.

Minghella died of a haemorrhage on 18 March 2008 in Charing Cross Hospital, Hammersmith, following an operation the previous week to remove cancer of the tonsils and neck.

Memorial plaques
A memorial plaque to Minghella was unveiled on 2 March 2016 by Jude Law, at Western Gardens, Ryde, Isle of Wight.
He is commemorated with a green plaque on The Avenues, Kingston upon Hull.  The 2009 film Nine is dedicated in his memory.

Filmography

Producer only

Acting roles

Selected plays
 Whale Music (New End Theatre, Hampstead, June 1981); revived for radio, BBC Radio 4, 10 May 2008
 Two Planks and a Passion (Greenwich Theatre, November 1984)
 A Little Like Drowning (Hampstead Theatre, July 1984)
 Made in Bangkok (West End debut as a playwright, Aldwych Theatre. 18 March 1986, director Michael Blakemore)
 Hang Up (radio play for BBC Radio 4,1987)
 Cigarettes and Chocolate (60-minute radio play for BBC Radio 4, 1988)
 Eyes Down Looking (Beckett 100th Birthday tribute, radio play for BBC Radio 3, 1 April 2006)

Awards

 1984 Plays and Players: Critics Award – Most Promising Playwright for A Little Like Drowning
 1986 Plays and Players: Critics Award – Best New Play for Made in Bangkok
 1988 Giles Cooper Award for the radio play Cigarettes and Chocolate
 1997 Broadcast Film Critics Association Award – Best Director and Best Screenplay for The English Patient (1996)
 1997 Directors Guild of America Award – Outstanding Achievement in Motion Pictures for The English Patient (1996)
 1997 Satellite Award – Best Adapted Screenplay for The English Patient (1996)
 1999 National Board of Review Award – Best Director for The Talented Mr. Ripley (1999)
 2003 National Board of Review Award – Best Adapted Screenplay for Cold Mountain (2003)
 2006 Laurence Olivier Award for Best New Opera Production for the English National Opera production of Madama Butterfly

Directed Academy Award performances

Minghella was directed multiple Oscar winning and nominated performances.

References
Theatre Record and its indexes for play production dates and awards

External links

Media Masterclass with Anthony Minghella on Directing Film
Anthony Minghella: A Life in Pictures, BAFTA webcast, 2 December 2006
Anthony Minghella interview with stv, November 2006
"About Anthony", Minghella Film Festival, Isle of Wight
Anthony Minghella, a brother to all he met by Dominic Minghella, 24 March 2008
An Appreciation of Anthony Minghella by Charlie Rose, 24 March 2008
Anthony Minghella, my teacher, my friend, by Harvey Weinstein, The Times, 10 April 2008
Anthony Minghella remembered by Jude Law, The Observer, Sunday 14 December 2008
Minghella musical discovered, BBC Humberside.
Obituaries:
BBC, 18 March 2008
The Guardian, 18 March 2008
Variety, 18 March 2008
The Guardian, 19 March 2008
The Daily Telegraph, 19 March 2008
The Times, 19 March 2008
The Independent, 19 March 2008
The New York Times, 19 March 2008
Los Angeles Times, 19 March 2008
The Washington Post, 19 March 2008
Tributes:
Minghella Movie Marathon, BBC, updated 25 March 2009. Retrieved 22 July 2009.
Minghella Movie Marathon, at British Film Institute. Retrieved 22 July 2009.
More stars join Minghella marathon, iwcp.co.uk, 4 March 2009. Retrieved 22 July 2009.
Anthony Minghella's family celebrates his memory with film festival, Syma Tariq, The Guardian, 12 March 2009. Retrieved 22 July 2009.

1954 births
2008 deaths
Deaths from bleeding
English film directors
English male screenwriters
English television writers
British opera directors
Best Adapted Screenplay BAFTA Award winners
Best Directing Academy Award winners
Best Director Golden Globe winners
Best Original Screenplay BAFTA Award winners
Filmmakers who won the Best Film BAFTA Award
Laurence Olivier Award winners
Alumni of the University of Hull
English people of Italian descent
People from Ryde
Commanders of the Order of the British Empire
German-language film directors
Italian British film directors
Patrons of schools
Deaths from oral cancer
Deaths from cancer in England
People educated at St John's College, Portsmouth
Directors Guild of America Award winners
English-language film directors
British male television writers
20th-century English screenwriters